My Bunny Lies over the Sea is a Warner Bros. Merrie Melodies cartoon, released on December 4, 1948.  This theatrical cartoon was directed by Chuck Jones and written by Michael Maltese. Mel Blanc played both Bugs Bunny and the Scotsman.

The title is a play on the second line of the old song, "My Bonnie Lies over the Ocean". Though this cartoon was the Scotsman's (named Angus MacRory) only theatrical appearance, he also made his second major role in "It's a Plaid, Plaid, Plaid, Plaid World" episode (first aired on February 3, 1996) in The Sylvester and Tweety Mysteries. The Scotsman appeared briefly in a 1989 TV special and on a couple of Animaniacs episodes. He can also be seen in the 1996 hit film, Space Jam, watching the Toon Squad/Michael Jordan basketball game.

Plot
This cartoon begins as Bugs Bunny once again gets lost when he is tunneling to his vacation spot. He accidentally ends up near Loch Lomond, Scotland, instead of the La Brea Tar Pits, having once again not "made that left toin at Albahkoiky!", and mistakes a Highlander named Angus MacRory playing the bagpipes for a lady being attacked by a "horrible monster". Bugs jumps MacRory, trying to rescue the "woman", and in the process he smashes his bagpipes to pieces.

MacRory becomes enraged that his bagpipes have been absolutely ruined. He yells at Bugs, and is about to threaten him, but Bugs figures out that MacRory is actually a man (much to Bugs's outrage) by pointing out to MacRory that he can't wear a skirt, not knowing it's a kilt (much to MacRory's confusion), and throws a barrel over MacRory for indecency.

Bugs then asks MacRory for the directions to the "La Brea Tar Pits in Los Ahn-galays", at first confusing then causing the Scotsman to threaten Bugs with a blunderbuss, telling the rabbit, "There are no La Brea Tar Pits in Scotland!" When Bugs realizes the location he is in, he bids MacRory, "Eh, what's up, MacDoc?", and runs for it just as MacRory shoots. MacRory chases after the bullet and picks it up ("It's been in the family for years"), reloads the bullet back into his gun, and shoots at Bugs repeatedly, who dives back into his hole (which MacRory fires into) and comes back out elsewhere moments later thinly disguised as an elderly Scotsman, accusing MacRory (whose last name is revealed by the disguised Bugs) of "poaching on [his] property". MacRory doesn't believe him, however, and challenges him to a traditional Scottish duel — a game. Bugs, upon hearing this, sets up a card game. MacRory corrects him, stating the challenge is a game of golf; as they head off, Bugs then asks MacRory: "Have it your way Mac, but don't ya get a little tired running them 18 bases?"
 
Throughout the golf game, Bugs continually outsmarts the Scotsman. On the first hole, Bugs, focusing on swinging the ball, looks down at the Scotsman for tapping his foot impatiently. MacRory stops tapping, and sheepishly hides his foot behind his other leg. After declaring "FORE!", Bugs takes his swing and the ball veers off course, so Bugs quickly digs another, bigger hole to earn a hole in one (with the real hole shown to be off in the distance). Bugs then nails MacRory's ball to the tee so that it won't go anywhere ("Fore!" "Four? Three-and-a-half."); but MacRory gets a hole in one anyway (through ending up in the hole himself), to Bugs' protests ("A hole in one? Why, you little cheater! You little four flusher! Why, you can't...").

On the 8th hole, MacRory laughs at Bugs, whose ball has fallen shorter of the hole than MacRory's. Bugs then turns his club into a pool cue, and hits a bank shot into the hole, causing MacRory to break his own club in half in anger.

Later, after being seen hitting his ball out of a bunker multiple times to get his ball in hole 16, Bugs figures how many strokes to write on his scoreboard. After he goes through elaborate motions of doing addition in the air, he announces his score: "Two." MacRory, not believing Bugs at all, counters: "Two? FIFTY-FIVE!" Bugs immediately sets up a fake auction, with Bugs acting as the auctioneer and continually lowering the score, until MacRory offers "one" as his "final offer", much to the dumbfounded Scotsman's surprise.

At the last hole, MacRory gets a hole in one. Bugs however misses the hole altogether and quickly digs a channel with his club for the ball to roll through into the hole. After checking his score, Bugs then declares himself the winner, whereupon the Scotsman angrily denounces the rabbit's earlier action as cheating. But Bugs defends himself with a list of phony "historical" citations where his action had also supposedly occurred: "Cheating? Why, that identical situation occurred in the New Hebrides Open. Kaduffleblaze versus Fuddle in 19-aught-18. And what about Fradis versus Ginfritter? Hah! Bizbo versus Stoigen in the Casablanca Amateur. Cheating, indeed! The noive!"

The Scotsman, realizing that "the weight of evidence is greatly against [him]", accepts defeat; but he still claims that he can't be beaten when it comes to playing bagpipes, and he grabs the instrument to demonstrate. After playing, he dares Bugs to try and top that — which, to MacRory's shock, the rabbit does by dressing like a Scot and playing not only the pipes, but also a trombone, a saxophone, a trumpet, two clarinets, cymbals on his feet, and a bass drum on his head with the beaters tied to his ears, in the manner of a one-man band. Bugs takes a final glimpse at the audience and waggles his eyebrow, before an iris-out.

Other appearances
 Bugs Bunny's Wild World of Sports: In this 1989 TV special, the Scotsman from the cartoon appears as a guest at the "Sportsman of the Year" awards banquet, as one of the nominees for the award. He is named by his full name for the first time when the announcer introduces him as, "That great Scottish golfer, Angus MacRory." Angus corrects the pronunciation of his name, and adds that it's spelled, "With fourteen r's." The special also shows clips from My Bunny Lies Over the Sea.
 The Sylvester and Tweety Mysteries: The Scotsman from the cartoon makes his second major role in the "It's a Plaid, Plaid, Plaid, Plaid World" episode. His full name, "Angus MacRory" is confirmed. He is revealed to be Granny's fourth cousin twice removed.
 Animaniacs: In the Dot's Quiet Time segment, when Dot is in Scotland, having finally found a quiet place, the Scotsman walks by Dot playing his bagpipes, disturbing her. In the Hurray for Slappy segment, he can be spotted both in the banquet hall and in the crowd at the end of the short.
 Space Jam: The Scotsman from the cartoon can be spotted on the bleachers watching the basketball playoff between the Toon Squad and the Monstars.

References

External links

1948 films
1948 short films
1948 animated films
Merrie Melodies short films
Warner Bros. Cartoons animated short films
Short films directed by Chuck Jones
Films set in Scotland
Golf animation
Films scored by Carl Stalling
Bugs Bunny films
1940s Warner Bros. animated short films
Films with screenplays by Michael Maltese